General Michał Tadeusz Tokarzewski-Karaszewicz, Coat of arms of Trąby pseudonym Doktor, Stolarski, Torwid (b. 5 January 1893 in Lemberg – 22 May 1964 in Casablanca, Morocco) was a Polish general, founder of the resistance movement "Polish Victory Service".

Early life
Tokarzewski served in the Polish Legions from 1914 until 1917, then in the POW (Polish Military Organization). He was a commanding officer of the "5th Infantry Legion Regiment" during the Polish-Ukrainian War, which fought in Lwów.

During the November–December 1918 pogroms in Poland, Tokarzewski was removed from his post by the Polish Government as District Commander of Przemysl for posting a notice in which he fined the Jewish population 3,000,000 crowns as punishment for allegedly fighting against the Polish army, despite their assertion of neutrality. This charge was never proven.

The poster read: "An appeal to the population of Przemysl of Mosaic Confession. (ie, the Jewish population) 
"In view of a well-known fact that in the course of the struggle of recapturing Przemysl, the Jews, notwithstanding their repeated assertion of neutrality, took part in the fight with the Ukrainian forces and fired on the attacking police detachment.

"I order the Jewish community to deposit at the district headquarters of the Polish troops of Przemysl a sum of 3,000,000 crowns."

After Poland regained independence in 1918, Tokarzewski served in the Polish Army. In April 1919 he participated in the Polish-Soviet War when Wilno was seized by Poland. From 1924 until 1926 he was commanding the 19th Infantry Division in Wilno, from 1928 until 1932 a commanding officer of the 25th Infantry Division in Kalisz and from 1932 until 1939 a commanding officer of the Corps area (okreg korpusu) in Grodno, Lwów and Toruń.

World War II

During the Polish Defensive War of 1939, he was commanding the Operation Group (grupa operacyjna) of the "Armia Pomorze" (Pomeranian Army). He fought in the Battle of Bzura and was the second-in-command of "Armia Warszawa" (Army Warsaw) which was commanded by general Juliusz Rómmel, during the defence of Warsaw.

In occupied Poland, on 27 September 1939 he founded the resistance movement "Służba Zwycięstwu Polski" (Polish Victory Service) and was its commander-in-chief until December 1939, when he became the commanding officer of the "3rd Lwów area (ZWZ)" under Soviet occupation. Crossing the new German–Soviet border, in March 1940 he was arrested and imprisoned by the NKVD.

After being released from prison, Tokarzewski was appointed a commanding officer of the "6th Infantry Division" of the Polish Army in the Soviet Union (Anders Army) in August 1941. From March 1943 until 1944 he served as the second-in-command of the Polish Army in the East. In 1944 he became a commander of the 3rd Polish Corps which was formed in Egypt.

After World War II

After the war he stayed in exile in England and settled in London. From 1954 on he was the General Inspector of the Armed Forces of the Polish forces in exile. He died on 22 May 1964 in Casablanca, Morocco. In September 1992 the urn with his ashes was transferred from Brompton Cemetery in London to Poland and buried at the Powązki Cemetery in Warsaw.

In 2006, General Tokarzewski's medals and battledress came up for public auction. Two Canadians, who were aware of the unfortunate history of Poland during World War II, were successful in their bid and brought the items to Canada. The two then donated the entire collection to "Poland and the Polish people" during a ceremony at the Polish Combatants' Association, Branch#20, in Toronto, Ontario, Canada. The collection was displayed at the Branch #20 museum until March, 2007, when it was shipped to Warsaw to be displayed in the Warsaw Military Museum in that city.

Awards 
 Commander of the Virtuti Militari Order
 Commander of the Order of Polonia Restituta
 Krzyż Niepodległości (Cross of Independence), with Swords
 Krzyż Walecznych (Cross of Valour), 4 times
 Złoty Krzyż Zasługi z Mieczami (Gold Cross of Merit with Swords), twice
 Order of the White Eagle (posthumously in 1964 by the Polish authorities in exile)

See also 
 Armia Krajowa
 2nd Polish Corps

References

1893 births
1964 deaths
Writers from Lviv
People from the Kingdom of Galicia and Lodomeria
Clan of Trąby
Polish Socialist Party politicians
Polish generals
Polish Military Organisation members
Polish Theosophists
Polish legionnaires (World War I)
Polish people of the Polish–Ukrainian War
Polish people of the Polish–Soviet War
People of the Polish May Coup (pro-Piłsudski side)
Polish military personnel of World War II
Polish resistance members of World War II
Polish people detained by the NKVD
Commanders of the Virtuti Militari
Recipients of the Cross of Independence with Swords
Commanders of the Order of Polonia Restituta
Recipients of the Cross of Valour (Poland)
Recipients of the Gold Cross of Merit (Poland)
Burials at Brompton Cemetery
Burials at Powązki Cemetery
Polish emigrants to the United Kingdom
Recipients of the Order of the White Eagle (Poland)